L'Animal is a 1977 French action comedy film directed by Claude Zidi and starring Jean-Paul Belmondo and Raquel Welch. It was distributed in the United States by Analysis Film Releasing Corp under the title Stuntwoman.

Plot
Mike Gauché (Jean-Paul Belmondo) is a professional film stuntman who works with his fiancée Jane Gardner (Raquel Welch). However minutes before their long planned marriage they are called to perform a car stunt for a movie but it goes wrong, as a brake problem causes their car to fall and they end up in a hospital with bruises and broken legs. Exasperated by the behavior of her fiancé, Jane decides to leave. After his recovery Mike is no longer able to find work in the movie business and is forced to simulate mental retardation and to invent a family to receive Social Security benefits. One day his stuntman friend Santos asks him to replace him from time to time at his job which involves dressing up as a gorilla for advertising pasta at a supermarket.

Mike's luck begins to improve as he gets offered a high salary to do the stunts of an effeminate movie star Bruno Ferrari (Jean-Paul Belmondo) whom he proves to be a dead ringer to. Ferrari, while filming an action movie, suffers from vertigo and finds himself unable to perform dangerous sequences. Mike does not hesitate to get rid of his new stunt partner in order to replace her with Jane, who is enamored with the Count of Saint-Prix (Raymond Gérôme). Having heard the news Mike goes to the Count while impersonating a server in order to propose the offer to Jane. When he hears that the Count has asked to marry Jane he manically sabotages the dinner and makes Jane promise to do the film.

Desperate to regain Jane, Mike impersonates Ferrari who turns out to be gay, to seduce her. However the young woman is not fooled. Mike must perform a dangerous stunt on the wing of an airplane to an audience of journalists who think they are seeing Ferrari, where his life is saved from the accident by Jane, who is to marry the Count very soon. Meanwhile, the press discovers that Ferrari is not doing his own stunts.

While the wedding ceremony takes place at the castle of the Count, Mike arrives disguised as a gorilla, scaring guests with animals from the property, and takes Jane, who refuses to marry Count of Saint-Prix, preferring to live her life with Mike.

Cast
Jean-Paul Belmondo as Mike Gaucher / Bruno Ferrari
Raquel Welch as Jane
Charles Gérard as Hyacinthe
Julien Guiomar as Fechner
Aldo Maccione as Sergio Campanese
Dany Saval as Doris
Raymond Gérôme as Count of Saint-Prix
Henri Génès : as Camille, café owner
Claude Chabrol as The Director
Mario David as Santos
Didier Flamand  as The Cousin
Josiane Balasko as Supermarket Girl
Jacques Alric 
Henri Attal as an assistant
Jane Birkin as The Female Star (cameo appearance)
Johnny Hallyday as The Male Star (cameo appearance)
Maurice Auzel
Maurice Bénichou 
Edouard Bergara 
Paul Bisciglia 
Richard Bohringer
Anne-Marie Coffinet 
Raphaële Devins
Isabelle Duby 
Martine Ferrière
Jean-Jacques
Jean-Jacques Moreau  
Gilles Kohler
Yves Mourousi 
Xavier Saint-Macary 
Agathe Vannier

Production
Most of the stunts in the film were done by Belmondo himself. This caused him multiple injuries; a dislocated ankle after the scene on the steps of Sacré-Cœur, dislocation and a penetrating wound after the scene in which he is tumbling down the stairs, a chewed up ear after the fight scene with a tiger. Because the insurance companies refused to insure aerial stunts they had to be filmed last. Everything went off without incident, and the actor was able to realize his childhood dream of personally standing on the wing of a flying airplane, a Fieseler Fi 156.

Box Office 
The film sold over 3 million tickets in France. It grossed a total of $7,196,268 million at the worldwide box office.

References

External links

 
Animal at Le Film Guide

1977 films
French action comedy films
1970s French-language films
Films about stunt performers
Films about filmmaking
Films directed by Claude Zidi
Films with screenplays by Michel Audiard
Films scored by Vladimir Cosma
1970s action comedy films
1977 comedy films
1970s French films